Nahida Bibi Khan (born 3 November 1986) is a Pakistani cricketer who plays as a right-handed batter, and occasional right-arm medium-fast bowler and wicket-keeper. She currently plays for Pakistan, and has played domestic cricket for Quetta, Balochistan, Saif Sports Saga and Zarai Taraqiati Bank Limited.

International career
Khan made her international one day debut on 7 February 2009 against Sri Lanka in Bogra. She was part of the team at the Women's Cricket World Cup in Australia later that year. Nahida was part of the team at the 2010 Asian Games in China, in which Pakistan won gold.

In October 2018, she was named in Pakistan's squad for the 2018 ICC Women's World Twenty20 tournament in the West Indies. In February 2019, during the series against the West Indies Women, she became the fifth cricketer for Pakistan Women to score 1,000 runs in Women's One Day Internationals (WODIs).

In February 2020, she was added to Pakistan's squad for the 2020 ICC Women's T20 World Cup, replacing Bismah Maroof who was ruled out due to an injury. In January 2022, she was named in Pakistan's team for the 2022 Women's Cricket World Cup in New Zealand.

References

External links
 
 

1986 births
Living people
Pakistani women cricketers
Pakistan women One Day International cricketers
Pakistan women Twenty20 International cricketers
Quetta women cricketers
Baluchistan women cricketers
Saif Sports Saga women cricketers
Zarai Taraqiati Bank Limited women cricketers
Asian Games gold medalists for Pakistan
Asian Games medalists in cricket
Cricketers at the 2010 Asian Games
Medalists at the 2010 Asian Games